Tess Fragoulis is a Canadian writer and educator. Born in Heraklion, Crete, Greece, she was raised in Montreal, Quebec, where she attended Concordia University. Her first book, Stories to Hide from Your Mother (Arsenal Pulp Press, 1997), was nominated for the QSPELL First Book Award. One of the stories was adapted for the television series Bliss. Her second book, Ariadne's Dream (Thistledown Press, 2001) was long-listed for the IMPAC International Dublin Literary Prize. She is the editor of Musings: an anthology of Greek-Canadian Literature (Véhicule Press, 2004). She has also published in numerous literary journals, magazines and newspapers in North America, and teaches literature and writing in Montreal. Her latest novel, The Goodtime Girl (2012), is published by Cormorant Books in Canada, and was published in Greek by Psichogios Publications in Greece in 2013 under the title Το Μαργαριτἀρι της Ανατολἠς (The Anatolian Pearl).

Bibliography

Short stories
Stories to Hide from Your Mother – 1997, Arsenal Pulp Press

Novels
Ariadne's Dream – 2001, Thistledown Press
The Goodtime Girl – 2012, Cormorant Books
The Goodtime Girl – 2013, Psichogios Publications

Anthologies edited
Musings: An Anthology of Greek-Canadian Literature – 2004 (with Steven Heighton and Helen Tsiriotakis), Véhicule Press

External links
 https://www.psichogios.gr/site/Books/show/1001392/to-margaritari-ths-anatolhs
 Tess Fragoulis Books
 / The Goodtime Girl Preview
 / 12 or 20 Questions with: Tess Fragoulis
 / Ariadne's Dream
 / Stories to Hide from Your Mother
 / Conquering Cupid

21st-century Canadian novelists
Canadian women novelists
Concordia University alumni
Greek emigrants to Canada
Living people
Cretan novelists
Canadian women short story writers
21st-century Canadian women writers
20th-century Canadian short story writers
20th-century Canadian women writers
21st-century Canadian short story writers
Year of birth missing (living people)